Karaca Arboretum is a private arboretum located in Yalova, Turkey.

Opened in 1980, it was named after its owner Turkish businessman Hayrettin Karaca.

References

Arboreta in Turkey
Botanical gardens in Turkey
Protected areas of Turkey
Protected areas established in 1980
1980 establishments in Turkey
Yalova